The 1977 Claxton Shield was the 38th annual Claxton Shield, an Australian national baseball tournament. It was held in Perth from 14 to 23 January, the eighth time Perth had hosted the Shield. Hosts Western Australia won the Shield for the third time. The other participating teams were New South Wales, Queensland, South Australia and Victoria.

Format
The five teams played a double round-robin schedule, meeting each other team twice, with two competition points on offer in each game. The points were awarded as follows:
 Win – two points
 Tie – one point
 Loss – no points
After each team has played their eight games, the team with the most points was declared the champions. In the event of a tie between teams in terms of points, the tiebreaker used would have been the net runs for and against, with the team achieving the greater value placing in the higher position.

Results

References

Bibliography
 

1977 in baseball
1977 in Australian sport
1977
January 1977 sports events in Australia